The 1918 United States Senate election in Mississippi was held on November 3, 1918. Incumbent Democratic U.S. Senator James K. Vardaman ran for re-election to a second term in office, but was defeated in the Democratic primary by U.S. Representative Pat Harrison.

Because Harrison faced only nominal opposition in the general election, his victory in the August 20 primary was tantamount to election.

Democratic primary

Candidates
James K. Vardaman, incumbent U.S. Senator since 1913
Edmond Noel, former Governor of Mississippi (1908–12)
Pat Harrison, U.S. Representative from Gulfport

Results

General election

Results

See also 
 1918 United States Senate elections

References 

1918
MIssissippi
1918 Mississippi elections